Jazz in the Space Age is an album by George Russell originally released on Decca in 1960. The album contains tracks conducted and arranged by Russell performed by Ernie Royal, Bob Brookmeyer, Frank Rehak, Al Kiger, Marky Markowitz, David Baker, Jimmy Buffington, Hal McKusick, Dave Young, Sol Schlinger, Bill Evans, Paul Bley, Barry Galbraith, Howard Collins, Milt Hinton, Don Lamond and Charlie Persip.

Reception
The Allmusic review by Ken Dryden states that "The three-part suite "Chromatic Universe" is an ambitious work which mixes free improvisation with written passages that have not only stood the test of time but still sound very fresh. "The Lydiot" focuses on the soloists, while incorporating elements from "Chromatic Universe" and other Russell compositions... the slow, somewhat mysterious "Waltz From Outer Space", which incorporates an Oriental-sounding theme, and "Dimensions", described by its composer as "a sequence of freely associated moods indigenous to jazz... represents some of George Russell's greatest achievements".

Track listing
All compositions by George Russell
 "Chromatic Universe, Part 1" - 3:33  
 "Dimensions" - 13:11  
 "Chromatic Universe, Part 2" - 3:47  
 "The Lydiot" - 10:04  
 "Waltz from Outer Space" - 6:59  
 "Chromatic Universe, Part 3" - 4:55  
Recorded May–August 1, 1960 in NYC

Personnel
George Russell: arranger, conductor
Ernie Royal: trumpet
Al Kiger: trumpet
Marky Markowitz: trumpet
Frank Rehak: trombone
David Baker: trombone 
Bob Brookmeyer: valve trombone
Jimmy Buffington: french horn
Hal McKusick: alto saxophone
Dave Young: tenor saxophone
Sol Schlinger: baritone saxophone
Bill Evans: piano
Paul Bley: piano
Barry Galbraith: guitar
Howard Collins: guitar
Milt Hinton: bass
Don Lamond: drums
Charlie Persip: drums

References

1960 albums
George Russell (composer) albums
Decca Records albums
Albums arranged by George Russell (composer)
Albums conducted by George Russell (composer)